T.S.O.L. (True Sounds of Liberty) is an American punk rock band formed in 1978 in Long Beach, California. Although most commonly associated with hardcore punk, T.S.O.L.'s music has varied on each release, including such styles as deathrock, art punk, horror punk and other varieties of punk music.

History 
Formed in 1978 in Long Beach, T.S.O.L. originated as a punk band. Originally under the name Vicious Circle, the band eventually changed their name to T.S.O.L by September 1980. The original lineup consisted of vocalist Jack Grisham (who has been credited as Jack Greggors, Alex Morgon, Jack Ladoga, Jack Delauge and Jack Loyd, among pseudonyms), guitarist Ron Emory, bassist Mike Roche and drummer Todd Barnes. According to legend, the band acquired their instruments by casing a local music shop, waiting until closing, and then performing a smash-and-grab robbery.

T.S.O.L.'s debut five-song EP, T.S.O.L., was released in spring 1981 by Posh Boy Records, featuring the reconvened original lineup. This first release was harshly political, featuring tracks such as "Superficial Love", "World War III" and "Abolish Government".

Their first full-length album, Dance with Me, was released later in 1981 on Frontier Records, and showcased a more gothic/deathrock sound. They then signed to independent label Alternative Tentacles, releasing the Weathered Statues EP early in 1982, and the melodic Beneath the Shadows album later that year; the latter featured a new member, keyboardist Greg Kuehn.

Amid personal turmoil, Grisham, Barnes and Kuehn all left the band in 1983.

After his exit, Grisham formed Cathedral of Tears, who released a 1984 EP on Enigma Records, followed by Tender Fury, who issued three albums: Tender Fury (1988), Garden of Evil (1989) and If Anger Were Soul, I'd Be James Brown (1991). Following the release of the Cathedral of Tears EP, T.S.O.L.'s replacement drummer, Mitch Dean, referred to Cathedral of Tears as a "synthesizer band" whose music he did not particularly like, adding, "not to make fun of it or anything," but that "[Grisham's] doing what he wants.  No hard feelings, Jack-babe."

T.S.O.L., however, chose to reconfigure. Bad Religion bassist Jay Bentley briefly joined in 1983 before Roche returned. Joe Wood and Mitch Dean joined on vocals and drums, after Ron Emory, who was at the time playing in Wood's band The Loners, asked him to start a new band with himself and Roche. This new lineup released four albums on Enigma: Change Today? (1984), Revenge (1986) Hit and Run (1987) and Strange Love (1990). All four albums featured a more polished production style, with Hit and Run reaching No. 184 on the Billboard 200 charts, and the band touring globally to support the releases. The band's first live album, Live, was issued by Enigma in 1988.

The band became friends with Guns N' Roses, and T.S.O.L. T-shirts were seen in the video for that band's "Sweet Child o' Mine", most notably on drummer Steven Adler.

Emory left the band in 1988, during the recording of demos for Strange Love, leaving Roche as the sole remaining original member--though Emory was given a writing credit on the track "Blow by Blow". T.S.O.L. were joined briefly by guitarist Scotty Phillips, who quit before the band started recording the follow-up to Hit and Run. They eventually hired former Dino's Revenge guitarist and actor Marshall Rohner. They released a blues-metal album, Strange Love, in 1990. Roche was fired shortly before the album's release and signed over rights to the name and trademark to Wood and Dean leaving the band with no original members. A compilation album titled Hell and Back Together 1984–1990 was issued in 1992 with an emphasis on their metal era.

This late-'80s lineup was popular enough to garner bookings in Brazil and Argentina, where the Grisham-led band held no legal rights to prevent Wood from gigging as T.S.O.L. In 1996, Wood and Dean were joined by guitarists Mike Martt and Drac Conley, and bassist Dave Mello (from Uniform Choice), with Dean subsequently replaced by Steve "Sully" O'Sullivan. Also in 1996, Wood formed ongoing blues band Joe Wood & the Lonely Ones (also including O'Sullivan). Wood recorded as Orange Wedge in 1993 (with Dean Chamberlain of the Motels and Christopher "Wag" Wagner of Mary's Danish) and Cisco Poison in 1995 (issuing the It's a Long Way to Heaven... album); he later fronted Joe Wood and the Killing Floor (also including O'Sullivan, longtime T.S.O.L. roadie Eric VonArab on Lead Guitar and professional skateboarder Ray "Bones" Rodriguez on Bass).

Meanwhile, the original members began playing shows under the name T.S.O.L, featuring the band's early material. They often played the same cities, on the same nights, as the other T.S.O.L. They also did some gigs during this time as "LOST" (T.S.O.L. backwards).

Grisham and Emory formed the Joykiller in 1995, releasing three albums prior to disbanding in 1998.

In 1999, the original members fought with Wood for rights to the name and won. They joined the Vans Warped Tour, playing for the first time in years under the name T.S.O.L.

Barnes died of a brain aneurysm on December 6, 1999, at the age of 34. The remaining members recruited drummer Jay O'Brien (formerly of All Day, later of American Jihad) and released the "Anticop" single (2001) and the albums Disappear (2001) and Divided We Stand (2003), all on Nitro Records, the latter of which featured Kuehn back on keyboards as well as Billy Blaze replacing O'Brien.

In November 2006, the band announced they were breaking up, with final performances having taken place earlier in the month. In September 2007, Cider City Records released the seemingly posthumous live album Live from Long Beach, recorded in November 2006 on the weekend of the band's two announced "farewell" performances. Their hiatus was short-lived, however, as they returned to perform local shows in late 2007. They also headlined the "Fuck the Whales, Save a Chckn" benefit in February 2008, held to help with cancer treatment bills for guitarist Craig "Chckn" Jewett of D.I.

In December 2008, the band entered the studio to record Life, Liberty & the Pursuit of Free Downloads, which was made available as a free download through sponsor Hurley International's website on January 8, 2009. It was also released on vinyl by DC-Jam Records on November 1, 2009.

Grisham launched another project, Jack Grisham and the Manic Low, in 2011; a debut album, Songs for an Up Day, was released in June 2012. He also formed Jack Grisham's LOST Soul in 2012, a gigging ensemble featuring Kuehn and Biuso, with the intent of performing T.S.O.L. and the Joykiller material.

On April 20, 2013, T.S.O.L. released a 7" EP, You Don't Have to Die (TKO Records), for Record Store Day, composed of the title track (an unreleased 1980 demo) and two 1981 live tracks. That same year, the band toured Europe and South America; they also completed a US tour with Flag.

On January 27, 2017, the band released The Trigger Complex album on Rise Records. In August 2017, Antonio Val Hernandez joined the band as drummer, replacing Hanna.

Film and television appearances 
In 1981, director Paul Young made Urban Struggle: The Battle of The Cuckoo's Nest, a film which featured live performances by T.S.O.L. as well as several Orange County punk and hardcore bands. Dave Markey's 1982 film The Slog Movie also featured live T.S.O.L. performances, as did Penelope Spheeris' 1984 Suburbia with their iconic performance's of "Wash Away" & "Darker My Love", they also appeared in the 1989 movie The Runnin' Kind. Their music was also featured in the popular 1985 horror movie The Return of the Living Dead and 1986 film Dangerously Close. They were also mentioned in the 2007 documentary Punk's Not Dead. The T.S.O.L. movie, Ignore Heroes is done and will be released soon, Greg Kuehn did the soundtrack for the movie and Jack Grisham directed the movie.

Members

Current members 
Jack Grisham – vocals (1978–1983, 1991, 1999–present)
Ron Emory – guitar (1978–1988, 1991, 1999–present)
Mike Roche – bass (1978–1990, 1991, 1999–present)
Greg Kuehn – piano, synthesizers (1982–1983, 2005–present)
Antonio Val Hernandez – drums (2017–present)

Former members 
Todd Barnes – drums (1978–1983, 1991, 1999; died 1999)
Joe Wood – vocals, guitar (1983–1999)
Mitch Dean – drums (1983–1998)
Marshall Rohner – guitar (1988–1996; died 2005)
Mike Martt – guitar (1996–1999)
Drac Conley – guitar (1996–2008
Dave Mello – bass (1996–1999)
Steve "Sully" O'Sullivan – drums (1998–2005)
Jay O'Brien – drums (1999–2003)
Billy Blaze – drums (2003)
Anthony "Tiny" Biuso – drums (2003–2014)
Matt Rainwater – drums (2014–2016)
Chip Hanna – drums (2016–2017)

Timeline

Discography 

Studio albums
 Dance with Me (1981)
 Beneath the Shadows (1982)
 Change Today? (1984)
 Revenge (1986)
 Hit and Run (1987)
 Strange Love (1990)
 Disappear (2001)
 Divided We Stand (2003)
 Life, Liberty & the Pursuit of Free Downloads (2009)
 The Trigger Complex (2017)

References

External links 

Deathrock.com T.S.O.L. section
 Joe Wood '83 to '96
1984 Interview with Artist Jim Blanchard and BLATCH Fanzine Staff BLATCH; Issue 10; Norman, OK

Hardcore punk groups from California
Musical groups established in 1978
American death rock groups
American gothic rock groups
Punk rock groups from California
Glam metal musical groups from California
Horror punk groups
Musical groups from Los Angeles
Alternative Tentacles artists
1978 establishments in California
Restless Records artists
Enigma Records artists